Olga Viacheslavovna Glatskikh (born 13 February 1989) is a retired Russian rhythmic gymnast. She won a gold medal in the group competition at the 2004 Summer Olympics in Athens.

In 2006, she was decorated by the Order of Friendship by presidential decree.

2018 scandal 
As of 2018, Glatskikh was the director of the Department of Youth Politics of Sverdlovsk Oblast. On 5 November, she made national headlines when, speaking in Kirovgrad, she stated that the state did not ask the citizens to make children and therefore the children should not expect to receive any support from the government. The governor, Yevgeny Kuyvashyov, on the same day dismissed the statement by Glatskikh as incorrect. Glatskikh was suspended from her job on the next day, while the Investigative Committee of Russia began an investigation into allegations of corruption and misappropriation of approximately 131 million rubles ( million dollars) in her department.

References

External links 

1989 births
Living people
Russian rhythmic gymnasts
Gymnasts at the 2004 Summer Olympics
Olympic gymnasts of Russia
Olympic gold medalists for Russia
Sportspeople from Yekaterinburg
Olympic medalists in gymnastics
Medalists at the 2004 Summer Olympics
United Russia politicians
21st-century Russian women politicians
Russian sportsperson-politicians
Financial University under the Government of the Russian Federation alumni
21st-century Russian women